Sērene Parish is an administrative unit of Aizkraukle Municipality in the Selonia region of Latvia.

Towns, villages and settlements of Sērene Parish 
Dīķi 
Krolīši 
Talsiņa 
Sērene

Parishes of Latvia
Aizkraukle Municipality
Selonia